Vaikom Ramachandran (വൈക്കം രാമചന്ദ്രൻ) (born 3 May 1962) is an Indian lyricist who writes in Malayalam language. He is the author of Chottanikkara Bhagavathy Suprabhatham. He is a recipient of Kerala Kshethra Anushtana Kalavedi's Nadasree award.

Personal life 
Vaikom Ramachandran was born to Vasudevan Nair and Leelavathy Amma on 3 May 1962 at Vaikom in Kottayam.Sri Vaikom Ramachandran was a District Supply Officer , and now working as Member of Consumer Dispute Redressal commission, Ernakulam.

Books 
Aarum Parayatha Kadhakal ( ആരും പറയാത്ത കഥകൾ) ചെറുകഥാ സമാഹാരം.
Hrudaya Sopanathile Pranava Manthrangal ( ഹൃദയസോപാനത്തിലെ പ്രണവമന്ത്രങ്ങൾ )
Jeevanum Moksha Margavum ( ജീവനും മോക്ഷമാർഗ്ഗവും  കീർത്തന സമാഹാരം.)
Aathmapournami (ആത്മപൗർണ്ണമി . കവിതാ സമാഹാരം)
Janinadanam(ജനിനടനം - കവിതാ സമാഹാരം)
Padmaharam( പദ്മഹാരം - കീർത്തനങ്ങൾ)
Eeakalochanam (ഏകലോചനം - കവിതാ സമാഹാരം)
SreeKrishnapoornamrutham ( ശ്രീകൃഷ്ണ പൂർണ്ണാമൃതം - കീർത്തനങ്ങൾ - ഗാനങ്ങൾ - സ്തുതികൾ - സുപ്രഭാത ഗീതങ്ങൾ - ശ്ലോകങ്ങൾ.. എന്നിവയുടെ സമാഹാരം.)
Maraprabhuvinte Manthrapeedom
(മരപ്രഭുവിന്റെമന്ത്രപീഠം - ഗുരുവായൂരിലെ മരപ്രഭുശില്പത്തിെന്റെനിർമ്മാണ കാലത്തെക്കുറിച്ചുള്ളവിവരണഗ്രന്ഥം )

References

External links 
 Janmabhumi Daily

Poets from Kerala
Living people
Malayalam-language writers
People from Vaikom
1962 births
Indian male poets
Malayalam poets
20th-century Indian poets
20th-century Indian male writers